The  Rothesay Lawn Tennis Tournament was a late Victorian era asphalt court tennis tournament first staged in 1885 at the Craigmore Grounds, Rothesay, Isle of Bute, Argyll and Bute, Scotland which ran until 1887.

History
The Rothesay Tournament was a grass court tennis tournament first staged in 1885 at the Craigmore Lawm Tennis Club Grounds, Rothesay, Isle of Bute, Argyll and Bute, Scotland  which ran until 1887.

Finals
Included:

Men's Singles
 1885— Lyle McLachlan def.  B.H. Harris, 6–4, 6–3, 3–6, 6-3 
 1886— Anderson Steel def.  Charles H. J. Higginbotham, 7–5, 6–2, 9-7 
 1887— James E. Lefroy Stein def.  J. Adam, 7–5, 6-1

Men's Doubles
 1885— Anderson Steel &  Dudley Stuart def.  M. Douglas &  Mr. Alexander, 6–2, 6–1, 6-3
 1886— Anderson Steel &  Dudley Stuart def.  J.A. Jackson &  Mr. Shand, 4–6, 6–3, 6–3, 6-3

Mixed Doubles
 1885—Anderson Steel &  Miss Campbell def.  Mr. Berry &  Mrs Berry, 6–0, 6-4 
 1886— Anderson Steel &  Miss Paterson def. A.S. Myrtle &  Miss Brown, 6–0, 6-0

References

Hard court tennis tournaments
Defunct tennis tournaments in the United Kingdom